Hanover is an unincorporated community in Wyoming County, West Virginia, United States.

Notable people
Jamie Noble, professional wrestler

References

Unincorporated communities in West Virginia
Unincorporated communities in Wyoming County, West Virginia